The Arkansas State University System, based in Little Rock, serves almost 40,000 students annually on campuses in Arkansas and Queretaro, Mexico, and globally online.

The Arkansas State University System includes Arkansas State University (A-State), a four-year research institution in Jonesboro with Campus Queretaro in Mexico, and four-year research institution, Henderson State University in Arkadelphia, as well as five independently accredited and functionally separate two-year institutions: ASU-Beebe, with additional campuses in Heber Springs and Searcy and an instructional site at Little Rock Air Force Base; ASU-Newport, with additional campuses in Jonesboro and Marked Tree; ASU-Mountain Home; ASU Mid-South in West Memphis; ASU Three Rivers (formerly College of the Ouachitas) in Malvern. Act 18 of 2021 added Henderson State University, a four-year institution in Arkadelphia, to the ASU System and expanded the ASU System Board of Trustees to seven members.

Charles L. Welch serves as president of the ASU System at its administrative offices in Little Rock. The chancellors are Kelly Damphousse at Arkansas State, Jennifer Methvin at ASU-Beebe, Johnny Moore at ASU-Newport, Robin Myers at ASU-Mountain Home,  Debra West at ASU Mid-South, Steve Rook at ASU Three Rivers, and Jim Borsig at Henderson State. A seven-member Board of Trustees appointed by the governor governs the system.

The ASU System provides a wide range of degree and certificate programs, serves as a leading voice on state higher education issues, and supports significant programs for the state and region, including economic development initiatives, the Arkansas Biosciences Institute, and Arkansas heritage sites.

The mission of the ASU System is to contribute to the educational, cultural, and economic advancement of Arkansas by providing quality general undergraduate education and specialized programs leading to certificate, associate, baccalaureate, master's, professional, and doctoral degrees; by encouraging the pursuit of research, scholarly inquiry, and creative activity; and by bringing these intellectual resources together to develop the economy of the state and the education of its citizens throughout their lives.

Campuses
 Arkansas State University, Jonesboro (primary campus)
Arkansas State University Campus Queretaro, Queretaro, Mexico
 Arkansas State University-Beebe, Beebe, Arkansas
 Arkansas State University-Beebe Searcy Campus, Searcy, Arkansas
 Arkansas State University-Beebe Heber Springs Campus, Heber Springs, Arkansas
 Arkansas State University-Beebe at Little Rock Air Force Base, Jacksonville, Arkansas
 Arkansas State University-Newport, Newport, Arkansas
 Arkansas State University-Newport Marked Tree Campus, Marked Tree, Arkansas
Arkansas State University-Newport Jonesboro Campus, Jonesboro, Arkansas
 Arkansas State University-Mountain Home, Mountain Home, Arkansas
 Arkansas State University Mid-South, West Memphis, Arkansas
 Arkansas State University Three Rivers, Malvern, Arkansas
Henderson State University, Arkadelphia, Arkansas

History

In 2006, the ASU System Office was created to facilitate future growth and enhanced services to the system institutions. The Board of Trustees named university president Dr. Les Wyatt as the first system president and Robert L. Potts as the first chancellor of the Jonesboro campus. The office was relocated from Jonesboro to Little Rock in 2011.

Arkansas State University in Jonesboro was established in 1909 as Arkansas State College. ASU-Beebe was established in 1927 as Junior Agricultural School of Central Arkansas and became part of ASU in 1955. ASU-Newport was founded as White River Vocational-Technical School in 1976 and became part of ASU-Beebe in 1992, but in 2002 the campus combined with Delta Technical Institute at Marked Tree to become a standalone institution. ASU-Mountain Home campus was established in 1995. Mid-South Community College in West Memphis became a member of the system in 2015 and changed its name to ASU Mid-South. College of the Ouachitas in Malvern became ASU Three Rivers and joined the ASU System on Jan. 1, 2020. The ASU System Board of Trustees on Dec. 6, 2019, approved a merger agreement and transition plan with Henderson State University in Arkadelphia, which would become the ASU System’s seventh member institution.

Act 18 of 2021 added Henderson State University, a four-year institution in Arkadelphia, to the ASU System and expanded the ASU System Board of Trustees from five to seven members.

References

External links
ASU System official site
Arkansas State University official site
Encyclopedia of Arkansas History & Culture entry

 
Educational institutions established in 1909
A
1909 establishments in Arkansas